Fate/stay night: Unlimited Blade Works is an anime series primarily based on the Unlimited Blade Works storyline in the Fate/stay night visual novel, in which Shirou Emiya, a high school student and amateur mage living in Fuyuki City, Japan, is dragged into the Fifth Holy Grail War, a secret magical tournament. In it, seven participants, known as "Masters", and their "Servants", reincarnated personifications of legendary heroes of history, fight in a battle royale for the Holy Grail, an omnipotent magical chalice that can fulfill any wish or desire for its victor. Shirou and his Servant Saber, are forced to team up with Rin Tohsaka, another Master in the Holy Grail War, but Shirou finds himself earning the strong dislike of Rin's mysterious Servant Archer, whose motivations are unknown.

The anime is jointly produced by Aniplex, Notes, and Ufotable, the same studios that co-produced the 2011–2012 anime adaptation for Fate/Zero. It is also directed by Takahiro Miura, with music composed by Hideyuki Fukasawa; character designs by Tomonori Sudou, Hisayuki Tabata, and Atsushi Ikariya, based on the original designs by Takashi Takeuchi; and art, 3D, and photography directions by Koji Eto, Kōjirō Shishido, and Yuichi Terao, respectively. The first half of the series ran from October 4 to December 27, 2014. The second half ran from April 4 to June 27, 2015. An advanced screening online premiered on September 28, 2014, in several countries across the world, including Japan, the United States, France, Germany and South Korea.

The first opening theme is "Ideal White" by Mashiro Ayano and the first ending theme is "Believe" by Kalafina. A cover version of "This Illusion" from the original visual novel was used as the ending theme for episode 12, performed by LiSA. The second opening theme is "Brave Shine" by Aimer and the second ending theme is "Ring Your Bell" by Kalafina. A remix of "Ring Your Bell", titled "Ring Your Bell (in the silence)", was used as the ending theme for episode 15. The song "Last Stardust", performed by Aimer, was used as an insert song for episode 20.

Series overview

Episode list

Season 1 (2014)

Season 2 (2015)

Home media release

Japanese

English

References

External links
Official Japanese website 
Official English website

Lists of Fate/stay night episodes
Fate stay night: Unlimited Blade Works